Mut is an ancient Egyptian mother goddess.

Mut may also refer to:
Mut (political party), in Germany
Precinct of Mut, Egyptian temple
Mut, Mersin, a district of Mersin Province, Turkey
Mut Castle, a castle in the area
Mut Wind Farm, a wind power plant in the area
Mut, a main settlement in the Dakhla Oasis, Egypt

MUT may also refer to:
Mangosuthu University of Technology, in Durban, South Africa
Methylmalonyl-CoA mutase, a mitochondrial enzyme
MUT (zinc finger protein), a synthetic zinc finger protein
Mauritius Time, a time zone used in Mauritius
MultiUser Talk, an obsolete BBS chat program
Military University of Technology in Warsaw
Manar University of Tripoli, in Lebanon

See also
MTU (disambiguation)
Mutt (disambiguation)
Mixed-breed dog (properly spelled as mutt)